During the 2000–01 English football season, Nottingham Forest F.C. competed in the Football League First Division.

Season summary
Forest improved on the previous season's disappointing 14th place to finish 11th, six points short of the play-off places. At the end of the season, player-manager David Platt left after two seasons in charge to manage the England Under-21 side. He was replaced by the club's under-19 coach and former Forest player, Paul Hart.

Forest suffered from below-average cup form, being knocked out of the League Cup by Division Three strugglers Darlington after losing 4–3 over two legs.

Final league table

Results
Nottingham Forest's score comes first

Legend

Football League First Division

FA Cup

League Cup

First-team squad
Squad at end of season

Left club during season

Reserve squad

Appearances

 

 

|-
|}

References

Nottingham Forest F.C. seasons
Nottingham Forest